SecureEasySetup, or SES is a proprietary technology developed by Broadcom to easily set up wireless LANs with Wi-Fi Protected Access. A user presses a button on the wireless access point, then a button on the device to be set up (printer, etc.) and the wireless network is automatically set up.

This technology has been succeeded by the industry-standard Wi-Fi Protected Setup. However, Wi-Fi Protected Setup was recently broken and has been shown to be easily breakable with brute-force attacks.

References
 Stephen Lawson (Jul 26, 2005) Linksys Simplifies Wireless Security, IDG News Service
 Glenn Fleishman, (January 12, 2005) Under the Hood with Broadcom SecureEasySetup, wifinetnews.com
 Rob Squires (9 January 2005) Broadcom, HP close wi-fi security hole, The Inquirer
 Security Now!, Episode 335, recorded January 9, 2012: WiFi Protected (In)Security http://www.grc.com/sn/sn-335.htm

External links
 Broadcom: SecureEasySetup
 Linksys Products and SecureEasySetup™ (SES) - Frequently Asked Questions

Wireless networking